Samuel Lewis Honey,   (9 February 1894 – 30 September 1918) was a soldier in the Canadian Expeditionary Force, and posthumous recipient of the Victoria Cross, the highest military award for gallantry in the face of the enemy given to British and Commonwealth forces, during the First World War. He had already been awarded the Military Medal and Distinguished Conduct Medal for actions earlier in the war.

Early life
Samuel Lewis Honey was born on 9 February 1894 in Conn in Ontario to Reverend George Edward Honey and Metta  Blaisdell. His father, originally from Boston, was a Methodist who moved his family from town to town as he took up a succession of ministries. Honey, who was known to his family as "Lew", attended schools in Drayton, Princeton and London, all in Ontario.

When he was 17, Honey went teaching at schools on the Six Nations Indian Reserve in Ontario. He then resumed his own education, attending Walkerton High School from which he graduated in mid-1914 with honours in several subjects. He returned to teaching for a brief period while planning to enter Victoria College at University of Toronto. However, with the First World War underway, he decided to join the Canadian Expeditionary Force.

First World War
Honey enlisted on 22 January 1915 and was posted to the 34th Battalion of the Canadian Expeditionary Force as a private. The battalion departed for England in October 1915, and by this time Honey had been promoted to sergeant. While in England he served as a physical fitness instructor, and briefly served with the 87th Battalion (Canadian Grenadier Guards), CEF before being transferred to the 78th Battalion, which was engaged on the Western Front.
 
He earned the Military Medal for his actions in a raid on German trenches on 22 February 1917, providing cover for both his squad and another in the face of heavy grenade fire, having cleared a communications trench. Afterwards, Honey wrote that his entire party deserved recognition as well. In April 1917, he fought in the Battle of Vimy Ridge, earning the Distinguished Conduct Medal (DCM) for leadership and maintaining morale in the face of extremely heavy fire. He was modest about his DCM, stating in correspondence that he was simply lucky.

Recommended for a commission after the battle, Honey was subsequently selected for officer training. Sent to England, he spent time at Bramshott Camp as an instructor before taking an officer's course at Bexhill. He was commissioned as a lieutenant in October 1917 and returned to the 78th Battalion for duty.

In late September 1918 at Bourlon Wood, the 78th Battalion participated in the Battle of the Canal du Nord. During the fighting on 27 September, Honey had to take command of his company due to all the other officers becoming casualties. He led the company in clearing German strongpoints and defending a number of counterattacks. Towards the end of the battle, he was wounded and died of these on 30 September 1918. He was buried in Pas de Calais in France, at the Queant Communal Cemetery.

For his actions during the Battle of the Canal du Nord, Honey was awarded the Victoria Cross (VC). The VC, instituted in 1856, was the highest award for valour that could be bestowed on a soldier of the British Empire. The citation for his VC, gazetted in early January 1919, read:

There was no formal presentation of the VC to Honey's relatives, at their request. Instead, the medal was sent to Canada by the War Office. In turn, the Governor General forwarded it on by mail to Honey's father. Plaques to his memory exist in several locations; Wescott United Church in Conn, Valour Place in Cambridge, Ontario, and the Galt Armoury.

Medals
 
His Victoria Cross is displayed at the Canadian War Museum in Ottawa, Canada, alongside his Distinguished Conduct Medal, Military Medal, British War Medal and Victory Medal.

Notes

References

External links
Samuel Lewis Honey's digitized service file
Biography at the Dictionary of Canadian Biography Online
Samuel Lewis Honey at the Canadian Virtual War Memorial  
Ontario Plaques - Lieutenant S. Lewis Honey, V.C., D.C.M., M.M. 1894-1918
Peter Mansbridge "Pausing to Remember" in Maclean's 

Canadian World War I recipients of the Victoria Cross
1894 births
1918 deaths
Canadian military personnel from Ontario
Canadian military personnel killed in World War I
Canadian recipients of the Distinguished Conduct Medal
Canadian recipients of the Military Medal
Canadian Expeditionary Force officers
People from Grey County
Winnipeg Grenadiers
Winnipeg Grenadiers officers